The South African Railways Class 21 2-10-4 of 1937 was a class of steam locomotives used in South Africa.

In 1937, the South African Railways placed a single Class 21 steam locomotive with a  Texas type wheel arrangement in service, designed as a mixed traffic locomotive suitable for use on light rail. A simultaneously proposed heavier mainline version Class 22  was never built.

Manufacturer
The Class 21 2-10-4 Texas type locomotive was designed by A.G. Watson, Chief Mechanical Engineer (CME) of the South African Railways (SAR) from 1929 to 1936. It was built by the North British Locomotive Company in Glasgow and delivered in 1937. Only one locomotive was built, numbered 2551. At the time, the design represented the maximum power obtainable from a ten-coupled non-articulated locomotive which was limited to a  axle load on  rail.

Characteristics
Watson disliked articulated locomotives and his aim was to develop a powerful non-articulated mixed traffic branch line locomotive with an axle load suitable for light rail. To enable it to negotiate tight curves of  radius, the third and fourth coupled wheelsets were flangeless. Its  bar frames extended from the front to the hind buffer beams and were stayed by cross stretchers of a light fabricated construction. It used a Watson Standard no. 3B boiler, the same as that used in the Classes 15E, 15F and 23.

The end result could be considered as Watson's answer to the Class GF Garratt locomotive, the two types having very similar axle loads. Even so, only one Class 21 was produced and the design was not repeated.

Watson's design called for cylinders with rotary cam poppet valve gear, but since the locomotive was still under construction when Watson retired, his successor as CME, W.A.J. Day, made use of the opportunity to alter the specifications. Thus, in the year following Watson's departure, the Class 21 locomotive was delivered with Walschaerts valve gear.

On the Class 21, the difference in stroke was made up by providing deep spigots on the cylinder covers.

The 2-10-4 Texas type wheel arrangement had not been tried before on the SAR. To distribute the axle loads to within the maximum allowed for branch lines, the ten-coupled arrangement with a four-wheeled trailing bogie was required. To further assist with keeping within the permissible weight limits, the cab was of welded construction and all footplates and running boards were made of duralumin while the axles and crank pins of the coupled wheels were hollow and the connecting rods were of special high tensile steel.

The equalised suspension of the engine was arranged in the customary three groups. The leading Bissel bogie and the first two pairs of coupled wheels were equalising in one group, while the remaining three pairs of coupled wheels were equalised with the trailing bogie, on each side (not cross-connected); thus three groups. As is usual, cross equalisation (LHS to RHS) was provided between the leading Bissel bogie and leading coupled wheels. Instead of pins, case-hardened cotters were provided for fulcrums of the bearing spring equalisinging beams. The locomotive was noted for its smooth running.

Tender
The Type FT tender was an unusual type which used six pairs of wheels in a 2-8-2 wheel arrangement, with the leading and trailing wheels in Bissel-type pony trucks and the rest of the axles mounted with a rigid wheelbase. Like the leading and trailing wheels of the engine, all tender wheels were fitted with roller bearings. The rationale behind the design was that if the tender frame could be carried on more points represented by the rigid and Bissel wheels instead of on only two bogie pivot centres, the frame could be made lighter.

The tender was equipped with a mechanical stoker. The water tank was of welded construction and the coal bunker was of the self-trimming design. Each Bissel truck was compensated with two pairs of rigidly mounted wheels. The eight rigidly mounted wheels were fitted with overhead laminated bearing springs while the spring gear for each pony truck and two adjacent axles were compensated throughout the springing system, constituting two equal groups. Vacuum cylinders mounted on top of the tank actuated brake blocks on the rigidly mounted wheels.

The tender's wheel arrangement did not prove to be very successful and with the exception of the Type JV tender, a similar experimental tender which had been built in the Salt River shops in 1936 during the design phase of the Class 21 as a prototype test-model of the Type FT tender, it was not used again on the SAR.

Another characteristic unique to the Type FT tender and its Type JV prototype was their left sides, where both had a space built-in to stow the fire-irons and rakes. The stowage space was open at the top, where the upper sides of both tender types were tied to the top of the coal bunker by four metal straps.

The Bissel or pony axle design is commonly used on steam locomotives with a single leading or trailing axle and was later also used on the Class 4E electric and Classes 32-000 and 32-200 diesel-electric locomotives.

Service
The locomotive began its career on trials at Braamfontein in 1937, working the Rhodesian Mail trains between Randfontein and Mafeking. Here it took loads exceeding those given to the Class 15CA.

A ten-coupled locomotive could only have 25% more tractive effort than an eight-coupled engine of similar axle load and with really heavy loads, the Garratt type had definite advantages and was much less severe on the track.

During the Second World War, the locomotive was often used to haul long and heavy military trains, troop trains and sometimes Italian prisoners-of-war to the military unit and prisoner-of-war camp at Sonderwater near Cullinan. In the process it was made the official mascot of the oldest military unit in Pretoria, the Pretoria Regiment (Princess Alice's Own). The  was the only SAR locomotive to be honoured in this way by the armed forces.

The Class 21 was scrapped in 1952 after only 15 years in service. During its time in service, it was equipped with smoke deflectors. Neither the Class 21 nor the aborted Class 22 design was repeated in either its original or modified form, leaving the impression that they represented advanced thinking which appears to have been considered as too far and too fast by Watson's successors.

When it was scrapped at the Pretoria shops, its Watson Standard no. 3B boiler was repaired and retained as a spare for use on the other locomotive classes equipped with this boiler model. Its Type FT tender was allocated to Kroonstad Loco as a spare tender for use on Class 15F locomotives, since all the Class 15Fs shedded at Kroonstad at the time were fitted with mechanical stokers. The Type FT could work coupled to these engines because they used the same type of Watson Standard no. 3B boiler and firebox arranged for mechanical firing as the Class 21. The tender was rarely used, if ever, since it had a smaller coal and water capacity than the Type JT tender normally fitted to the Class 15F.

The aborted Class 22
A design for a Class 22 steam locomotive, Watson's final design, was submitted at about the same time. It was to have been a massive machine with larger  coupled wheels, a larger  grate and the larger Type EW tender which was later to be used with the Class 23 locomotive.

If this engine had been built, it may have been one of the world's most outstanding locomotives.

The design was a compromise between a 2-8-4 passenger class with  coupled wheels and a  freight locomotive with  coupled wheels. At the time, however, the demand for general utility locomotive types was so pronounced that no good argument could be put forward for the introduction of a heavy locomotive dedicated to goods working only. Another factor which acted against the project was the insufficient length of the receiving sidings in the yards which made it doubtful that such a locomotive would have been able to be used to its full capacity.

Although the Class 22 was never built, the class number was not used for another steam locomotive type.

Illustration
The main picture shows no. 2551 with smoke deflectors installed, c. 1945, while the following show both sides of the locomotive and illustrate the difference between the left and right sides of the Type FT tender.

References

2040
2040
2040
2040
2-10-4 locomotives
1E2 locomotives
NBL locomotives
Cape gauge railway locomotives
Railway locomotives introduced in 1937
1937 in South Africa
Scrapped locomotives